Insect Woman may refer to:
 The Insect Woman, a 1963 Japanese drama film
 Insect Woman (1972 film), a South Korean film